The Chüebodenhorn is a 3,070 metres high mountain in the Lepontine Alps, located on the border between the cantons of Valais and Ticino. It is situated south of Passo di Rotondo (2,754 metres), where a glacier named Ghiacciaio del Pizzo Rotondo lies at the foot of its north face. The south side (Ticino) overlooks the valley of Bedretto.

References

External links
Chüebodenhorn on Summitpost

Mountains of the Alps
Alpine three-thousanders
Mountains of Switzerland
Mountains of Ticino
Mountains of Valais
Ticino–Valais border
Lepontine Alps